Three Day Moon is an album by American jazz bassist Barre Phillips recorded in 1978 and released on the ECM label.

Track listing
All compositions by Barre Phillips
 "A-i-a" - 9:41  
 "Ms. P." - 4:59  
 "La Folle" - 5:18  
 "Brd" - 8:38  
 "Ingul-Buz" - 3:58  
 "S. C. & W." - 9:27

Personnel
Barre Phillips — bass
Terje Rypdal — guitar, guitar synthesizer
Dieter Feichtner — synthesizer
Trilok Gurtu — tabla, percussion

References

ECM Records albums
Barre Phillips albums
1978 albums
Albums produced by Manfred Eicher